The 1999–2000 season was the 101st season of competitive league football in the history of English football club Wolverhampton Wanderers. They played the season in the second tier of the English football system, the Football League First Division.

For a second consecutive season the team finished in seventh position, missing out on the play-offs by one place. Defeat in their penultimate match to play-off rivals Bolton Wanderers ultimately doomed them to miss out.

Results

Pre-season
Wolves spent several weeks of pre-season training in Sölvesborg, Sweden. They played against four local sides during this tour, their first visit to the country since 1994, before returning home to face further opposition.

"Wolves XI" pre season results (all away): 0–1 vs Hereford United (21 July), 3–1 vs Tiverton (28 July), A–A vs Telford United (2 August, abandoned at half time due to lightning)

Football League First Division

A total of 24 teams competed in the Football League First Division in the 1999–2000 season. Each team played every other team twice: once at their stadium, and once at the opposition's. Three points were awarded to teams for each win, one point per draw, and none for defeats.

The provisional fixture list was released on 24 June 1999, but was subject to change in the event of matches being selected for television coverage or police concerns.

Final table

Source: Statto.com
Results summary

Results by round

FA Cup

League Cup

Players

Statistics

|-
|align="left"|||align="left"|||align="left"| 
|18||0||0||0||2||0||20||0||0||0||
|-
|align="left"|||align="left"|||align="left"| 
|45||4||2||0||2||0||49||4||8||1||
|-
|align="left"|||align="left"|||align="left"| 
|46||3||3||0||2||0||style="background:#98FB98"|51||3||3||0||
|-
|align="left"|||align="left"|||align="left"| 
|||3||3||1||2||0||||4||5||0||
|-
|align="left"|||align="left"|||align="left"|  (c)
|||2||2||0||2||1||||3||6||0||
|-
|align="left"|||align="left"|||align="left"| 
|||5||3||0||2||1||||6||0||0||
|-
|align="left"|||align="left"|||align="left"| 
|||0||||0||||0||||0||0||0||
|-
|align="left"|||align="left"|||align="left"| 
|||0||||0||0||0||||0||7||1||
|-
|align="left"|||align="left"|FW||align="left"| 
|||4||||0||2||0||||4||1||0||
|-
|align="left"|10||align="left"|FW||align="left"|  †
|||2||0||0||||0||||2||0||0||
|-
|align="left"|10||align="left"|FW||align="left"| 
|||16||3||0||0||0||style="background:#98FB98"|||16||4||1||
|-
|align="left"|11||align="left"|||align="left"| 
|||0||3||0||2||0||style="background:#98FB98"|||0||1||0||
|-
|align="left"|12||align="left"|||align="left"| 
|||2||3||0||2||0||||2||4||0||
|-
|align="left"|13||align="left"|||align="left"| 
|0||0||0||0||0||0||0||0||0||0||
|-
|align="left"|14||align="left"|||align="left"|  †
|||1||||0||2||0||||1||0||0||
|-
|align="left"|14||align="left"|||style="background:#faecc8" align="left"|  ‡
|||2||0||0||0||0||style="background:#98FB98"|||2||0||0||
|-
|align="left"|15||align="left"|||align="left"| 
|||5||2||1||0||0||||6||3||0||
|-
|align="left"|16||align="left"|||align="left"|  ¤
|||0||0||0||0||0||||0||0||0||
|-
|align="left"|17||align="left"|FW||align="left"|  ¤
|||0||0||0||0||0||||0||0||0||
|-
|align="left"|18||align="left"|||align="left"| 
|0||0||0||0||0||0||0||0||0||0||
|-
|align="left"|19||align="left"|||align="left"|  ¤
|||0||0||0||0||0||||0||0||0||
|-
|align="left"|20||align="left"|||align="left"|  †
|0||0||0||0||0||0||0||0||0||0||
|-
|align="left"|20||align="left"|FW||style="background:#faecc8" align="left"|  ‡
|||6||2||0||0||0||style="background:#98FB98"|||6||1||0||
|-
|align="left"|21||align="left"|||align="left"| 
|||0||0||0||0||0||style="background:#98FB98"|||0||0||0||
|-
|align="left"|22||align="left"|FW||align="left"| 
|||0||0||0||||1||style="background:#98FB98"|||1||0||0||
|-
|align="left"|23||align="left"|||style="background:#faecc8" align="left"|  ‡
|||5||3||0||0||0||style="background:#98FB98"|||5||5||1||
|-
|align="left"|24||align="left"|||align="left"| 
|||3||0||0||0||0||style="background:#98FB98"|||3||4||0||
|-
|align="left"|25||align="left"|||align="left"| 
|0||0||0||0||0||0||0||0||0||0||
|-
|align="left"|26||align="left"|FW||align="left"|  
|||0||0||0||0||0||style="background:#98FB98"|||0||0||0||
|-
|align="left"|27||align="left"|||align="left"| 
|28||0||3||0||0||0||style="background:#98FB98"|31||0||0||0||
|-
|align="left"|28||align="left"|||align="left"| 
|0||0||0||0||0||0||0||0||0||0||
|-
|align="left"|29||align="left"|||align="left"| 
|0||0||0||0||0||0||0||0||0||0||
|-
|align="left"|30||align="left"|||style="background:#faecc8" align="left"|  ‡
|0||0||0||0||0||0||0||0||0||0||
|-
|align="left"|31||align="left"|FW||align="left"| 
|0||0||0||0||0||0||0||0||0||0||
|}

Awards

Transfers

In

Out

Loans in

Loans out

Kit
The season retained the club's home kit from the previous season, but brought a new away kit that was again a white shirt but with a change to a black collar. Both were manufactured by Puma and sponsored by Goodyear.

References

Wolverhampton Wanderers F.C. seasons
Wolverhampton Wanderers